The Federal Ministry of Health, abbreviated BMG, is a cabinet-level ministry of the Federal Republic of Germany. It is the highest German federal government department responsible for health. The ministry is officially located in Bonn and with a second office, which houses the ministry's management, located in Berlin.

History 
The Federal Ministry of Health was founded in 1961; in 1969 it was merged with the Federal Ministry for Family and Youth to create the new Federal Ministry for Youth, Family and Health.

In 1991, the Federal Ministry of Health was restored. In 2002, it was expanded to include social affairs and renamed "Federal Ministry of Health and Social Security". It was headed by the Federal Minister for Health and Social Security. Its portfolio included one part of the former Federal Ministry of Labour and the Social Order. The other part of the latter was added to the portfolio of the newly created Federal Ministry for Economics and Labour. Under the grand coalition headed by Angela Merkel in 2005, the portfolio reshuffle was reversed and responsibility for social affairs was moved back to the Federal Ministry of Labour and Social affairs.

Ministers 
Political Party:

Responsibilities of the Federal Ministry of Health 

The Federal Ministry of Health is responsible for:
 maintaining the effectiveness and efficiency of the statutory health insurance and long-term care insurance systems
 maintaining and enhancing the quality of the health care system
 strengthening the interests of patients
 maintaining economic viability and stabilization of contribution levels
 preventive and prophylactic healthcare
 the Protection against Infection Act (or IfSG)
 establishing guidelines for the manufacture, clinical trial, approval, distribution channels and monitoring of medicines and medical devices. The objectives are:
 quality, medical efficacy and safety
 safety of biological medical products such as blood products
 narcotics and addiction risk prevention
 prevention, rehabilitation and disability policy
 medical and occupational rehabilitation
 disability law
 providing assistance to the disabled and promoting their interests
 European and international health policy, including the work of the Federal Government Narcotics Officer and the patients' ombudsman.

Supervisory role 
The Federal Ministry of Health is responsible for the comprehensive (disciplinary) supervision of the following governmental institutions:
Federal Institute for Drugs and Medical Devices (abbreviated BfArM) in Bonn
 Federal Centre for Health Education (abbreviated BZgA) in Cologne
 German Institute of Medical Documentation and Information (abbreviated DIMDI) in Cologne
  (PEI), the Federal Institute for Vaccines and Biomedicines in Langen, Hesse
 Robert Koch Institute (RKI) in Berlin

The Federal Ministry of Health is also responsible for the non-disciplinary supervision of
 the German Federal (Social) Insurance Authority.
and the legal supervision of the umbrella organizations of the statutory health insurance schemes.

See also 
 European Commission's Directorate General for Health and Consumer Protection (SANCO)
 Federal Ministry of Health and Social Affairs (2002–2005)

References

External links 
 Federal Ministry of Health official web site 
 Federal Ministry of Health official web site 
 European Observatory on Health Systems and Policies > Country information Germany

Health
Germany, Health
Germany
1961 establishments in West Germany